Play Ball is a 1925 American drama film serial directed by Spencer Gordon Bennet and starring Walter Miller and Allene Ray. The film is now considered to be lost. Another 1925 film, a comedy short starring Chester Conklin and Milburn Morante, also used the title Play Ball.

Cast
 Walter Miller as Jack Rollins
 Allene Ray as Doris Sutton
 Harry Semels as Count Segundo
 J. Barney Sherry as Thomas W. Sutton
 Mary Milnor as Maybelle Pratt
 Wally Oettel as Rutger Farnsworth
 Franklyn Hanna as Senator Hornell
 John McGraw as self
 New York Giants baseball team

Chapter titles

"To the Rescue"
"The Flaming Float"
"Betrayed"
"The Decoy Wire"
"Face to Face"
"The Showdown"
"A Mission of Hate"
"Double Peril"
"Into Segundo’s Hands"
"A Home Plate Wedding"

See also
 List of film serials
 List of film serials by studio
 List of lost films

References

External links

Glass slide at worthpoint.com

1925 films
American silent serial films
1925 drama films
American black-and-white films
Pathé Exchange film serials
Films directed by Spencer Gordon Bennet
Lost American films
Silent American drama films
1925 lost films
1920s American films